Rhampholeon tilburyi, the Mount Namuli pygmy chameleon, is a small species of chameleon endemic to Mozambique.

References

Rhampholeon
Reptiles of Mozambique
Endemic fauna of Mozambique
Reptiles described in 2014
Taxa named by William Roy Branch
Taxa named by Krystal A. Tolley